The  was the 17th edition of the Ghana Music Awards which was held on May 7, 2016, at the Accra International Conference Center in Accra, Ghana and was hosted by Chris Attoh, DJ Black and Naa Ashorkor. E.L was the biggest winner at the event, taking home a total of five awards including the coveted ‘Artiste of the Year’ with Sarkodie and Bisa Kdei won four awards each. These musicians, alongside Stonebwoy, Efya, R2Bees, Wizkid, Joe Mettle and Adomaa, performed at the event.

Performers
The following artistes performed at the 2016 Ghana Music Awards:
Sarkodie
Wizkid
Stonebwoy
Efya
Joe Mettle
Adomaa
Bisa Kdei
Kofi Kinaata
E.L

Nominees and winners
Below is the list of winners for the popular music categories. 

 Artiste of the Year – E.L
 Afropop Song of the Year – "Minaa Bo Po" by E.L
 Hiplife/Hip Hop Artiste of the Year – E.L
 Producer of the Year – E. L
 Music video of the Year – Shelele by E.L
 Hip Hop Song of the Year – Hand to Mouth by Sarkodie
 Rapper of the Year – Sarkodie
 Record of the Year – Sarkodie ft. Pat Thomas – Bra
 Reggae/Dancehall Artiste of the Year – Stonebwoy
 Reggae/Dancehall Song of the Year – Go Higher by Stonebwoy
 Highlife Artiste of the Year – Bisa Kdei
 Highlife Song of the Year – Mansa by Bisa Kdei
 Most Popular Song of the Year – Mansa by Bisa Kdei
 Album of the Year – Bisa Kdei
 Best Group of the Year – VVIP
 Collaboration of the Year – VVIP ft Sena Dagadu
 SongWriter of the Year – Kofi Kinaata
 Best New Artiste of the Year – Kofi Kinaata
 Gospel Song of the Year – Nicholas Omane Acheampong (Aposor)
 Hiplife Song of the Year – "Yewo Krom" by Atom
 Gospel Artiste of the Year – SP Kofi Sarpong
 Best Female Vocalist of the Year – MzVee
 Best Male Vocalist of the Year – Pat Thomas
 African Artiste of the Year – Wizkid
 Peace Song Winner – New Generation Gospel Ministers
 Traditional Artiste of the Year – Tesa Music Group
 Lifetime Achievement Award – AB Crentsil
 Sound Engineer of the Year – Kaywa
 Music for Development Award – Gasmilla
 Instrumentalist of the Year – Justice Williams (Shikome)

References

2016 music awards
Vodafone Ghana Music Awards